The 2012 season was Strømsgodset's 6th season in Tippeligaen following their promotion back to the top flight in 2006. It was Ronny Deila's fifth season in charge and they finished 2nd in the Tippeligaen and were knocked out of the 2012 Norwegian Football Cup at the Quarterfinal stage by Brann.

Squad

Transfers

Winter

In:

Out:

Summer

In:

Out:

Competitions

Tippeligaen

Results summary

Results by round

Results

Table

Norwegian Cup

Squad statistics

Appearances and goals

|-
|colspan="14"|Players away from Strømsgodset on loan:
|-
|colspan="14"|Players who left Strømsgodset during the season:

|}

Goal scorers

Disciplinary record

References

Strømsgodset Toppfotball seasons
Stromsgodset